The Bunun language is spoken by the Bunun people of Taiwan. It is one of the Formosan languages, a geographic group of Austronesian languages, and is subdivided in five dialects: Isbukun, Takbunuaz, Takivatan, Takibaka and Takituduh. Isbukun, the dominant dialect, is mainly spoken in the south of Taiwan. Takbunuaz and Takivatan are mainly spoken in the center of the country. Takibaka and Takituduh both are northern dialects. A sixth dialect, Takipulan, became extinct in the 1970s.

The Saaroa and Kanakanavu, two smaller minority groups who share their territory with an Isbukun Bunun group, have also adopted Bunun as their vernacular.

Name
The name Bunun literally means "human" or "man".

Dialects
Bunun is currently subdivided into five dialects: Isbukun, Takbunuaz, Takivatan, Takibaka and Takituduh. Li (1988) splits these dialects into three main branches — Northern, Central, and Isbukun (also classified as Southern Bunun). Takipulan, a sixth dialect, became extinct in the 1970s. Isbukun, the prestige dialect, is also the most divergent dialect. The most conservative dialects are in the Northern branch.

Proto-Bunun
Isbukun
North-Central
Northern
Takituduh
Takibakha
Central
Takbanuaz
Takivatan
Bunun was originally spoken in and around Sinyi Township (Xinyi) in Nantou County. From the 17th century onwards, the Bunun people expanded towards the south and east, absorbing other ethnic groups such as the Saaroa, Kanakanavu, and Thao. Bunun is spoken in an area stretching from Ren-ai Township in Nantou in the north to Yan-ping Township in Taitung in the south. Isbukun is distributed throughout Nantou, Taitung, and Kaohsiung. Takbanuaz is spoken in Nantou and southern Hualien County. Takivatan is spoken in Nantou and central Hualien. Both Takituduh and Takibakha are spoken in Nantou.

Phonology

Consonants

Orthographic notes:
  as ⟨j⟩.

Notes:
The glides  exist, but are derived from the underlying vowels  to meet the requirements that syllables must have onset consonants. They are therefore not part of the consonant inventory.
The dental fricative  is actually interdental.
While Isbukun drops the intervocalic glottal stops found in other dialects,  also occurs where  occurs in other dialects. (For example, the Isbukun word [mapais] bitter is [mapaʔis] in other dialects; the Isbukun word [luʔum] 'cloud' is [luhum] in other dialects.)

Vowels

Notes:
 does not occur in Isbukun.

Grammar

Overview
Bunun is a verb-initial language and has an Austronesian alignment system or focus system. This means that Bunun clauses do not have a nominative–accusative or absolutive–ergative alignment, but that arguments of a clause are ordered according to which participant in the event described by the verb is 'in focus'. In Bunun, four distinct roles can be in focus: 
 the agent: the person or thing that is doing the action or achieving/maintaining a state;
 the undergoer: the person or thing that is somehow participating in the action without being an agent; there are three kinds of undergoers:
 patients: persons or things to whom an action is done or an event happens
 instruments: things (sometimes persons) which are used to perform an action
 beneficiaries (also called recipients): the persons (sometimes things) for whom an action is done or for whom an event happens
 the locative participant: the location where an action takes place; in languages with a Philippine-style voice system, spatial location is often at the same level in a clause as agents and patients, rather than being an adverbial clause, like in English.
Which argument is in focus is indicated on the verb by a combination of prefixes and suffixes.
 a verb in agent focus is often unmarked, but can get the prefix ma- or – more rarely – pa- or ka-
 a verb in undergoer focus gets a suffix -un
 a verb locative focus gets a suffix -an
Many other languages with a focus system have different marking for patients, instruments and beneficiaries, but this is not the case in Bunun. The focussed argument in a Bunun clause will normally always occur immediately after the verb (e.g. in an actor-focus clause, the agent will appear before any other participant) and is in the Isbukun dialect marked with a post-nominal marker a.

Bunun has a very large class of auxiliary verbs. Concepts that are expressed by auxiliaries include:
 negation (ni 'be not' and uka 'have not')
 modality and volition (e.g. maqtu 'can, be allowed')
 relative time (e.g. ngausang 'first, beforehand', qanaqtung 'be finished')
 comparison (maszang 'the same, similarly')
 question words (e.g. via 'why?')
 sometimes numerals (e.g. tatini '(be) alone, (be) only one')
In fact, Bunun auxiliaries express all sorts of concepts that in English would be expressed by adverbial phrases, with the exception of time and place, which are normally expressed with adverbial phrases.

Word classes
Takivatan Bunun has the following word classes (De Busser 2009:189). (Note: Words in open classes can be compounded, whereas those in closed classes cannot.)

Open classes
Nouns
Verbs
Adjectives

Closed classes
Demonstratives
Anaphoric pronouns
Personal pronouns
Numerals
Place words
Time words
Manner words
Question words
Auxiliaries

Affixes
Bunun is morphologically agglutinative language and has a very elaborate set of derivational affixes (more than 200, which are mostly prefixes), most of which derive verbs from other word classes. Some of these prefixes are special in that they do not only occur in the verb they derive, but are also foreshadowed on a preceding auxiliary. These are called lexical prefixes or anticipatory prefixes and only occur in Bunun and a small number of other Formosan languages.

Below are some Takivatan Bunun verbal prefixes from De Busser (2009).

In short:
Movement from: Cu-
Dynamic event: Ca-
Stative event: Ci-
Inchoative event: Cin-
Neutral: mV-
Causative: pV-
Accusative: kV-

A more complete list of Bunun affixes from De Busser (2009) is given below.

Focus
agent focus (AF): -Ø
undergoer focus (UF): -un (also used as a nominalizer)
locative focus (LF): -an (also used as a nominalizer)

Tense-aspect-mood (TAM) affixes
na- irrealis (futurity, consequence, volition, imperatives). This is also the least bound TAM prefix.
-aŋ progressive (progressive aspect, simultaneity, expressing wishes/optative usage)
-in perfective (completion, resultative meaning, change of state, anteriority)
-in- past/resultative (past, past/present contrast)
-i- past infix which occurs only occasionally

Participant cross-reference
-Ø agent
-un patient
-an locative
is- instrumental
ki- beneficiary

Locative prefixes
Stationary ‘at, in’: i-
Itinerary ‘arrive at’: atan-, pan-, pana-
Allative ‘to’: mu-, mun-
Terminative ‘until’: sau-
Directional ‘toward, in the direction of’: tan-, tana-
Viative ‘along, following’: malan-
Perlative ‘through, into’: tauna-, tuna-, tun-
Ablative ‘from’: maisna-, maina-, maisi-, taka-

Event-type prefixes
ma- Marks dynamic events
ma- Marks stative events
mi- Marks stative negative events
a- Unproductive stative prefix
paŋka- Marks material properties (stative)
min- Marks result states (transformational)
pain- Participatory; marks group actions

Causative
pa- causative of dynamic verb
pi- causative of stative verb
pu- cause to go towards

Classification of events
mis- burning events
tin- shock events
pala- splitting events
pasi- separating events
kat- grasping events

Patient-incorporating prefixes
bit- 'lightning'
kun- 'wear'
malas- 'speak'
maqu- 'use'
muda- 'walk'
pas- 'spit'
qu- 'drink'
sa- 'see'
tal- 'wash'
tapu- 'have trait'
tastu- 'belong'
taus-/tus- 'give birth'
tin- 'harvest'
tum- 'drive'

Verbalizers
pu- verbalizer: 'to hunt for'
maqu- verbalizer: 'to use'
malas- verbalizer: 'to speak'

Pronouns
Takivatan Bunun personal pronoun roots are (De Busser 2009:453):
1s: -ak-
2s: -su-
3s: -is-
1p (incl.): -at-
1p (excl.): -ðam-
2p: -(a)mu-
3p: -in-

The tables of Takivatan Bunun personal pronouns below are sourced from De Busser (2009:441).

Iskubun Bunun personal pronouns are somewhat different (De Busser 2009:454).

Demonstratives
Takivatan Bunun has the following demonstrative roots and affixes (De Busser 2009:454):

Demonstrative suffixes
Proximal: -i
Medial: -un
Distal: -a

Demonstrative roots
aip-: singular
aiŋk-: vague plural
aint-: paucal
ait-: inclusive generic

Demonstrative prefixes
Ø-: visible
n-: not visible

Place words
ʔiti here
ʔitun there (medial)
ʔita there (distal)

Function words
sia anaphoric marker, "aforementioned"; also used as a hesitation marker
tu attributive marker
duma "others"
itu honorific marker

Takivatan Bunun also has definitive markers.

Notes

References

External links 

 Kaipuleohone's Robert Blust collection includes elicited materials on Bunun.
 Yuánzhùmínzú yǔyán xiànshàng cídiǎn 原住民族語言線上詞典  – Bunun search page at the "Aboriginal language online dictionary" website of the Indigenous Languages Research and Development Foundation
 Bunun teaching and leaning materials published by the Council of Indigenous Peoples of Taiwan 
 Bunun translation of President Tsai Ing-wen's 2016 apology to indigenous people – published on the website of the presidential office

Agglutinative languages
Formosan languages
Languages of Taiwan
Bunun people